Pico La Concha is a mountain in the Andes of Venezuela. It has a height of 4,922 metres.

See also

List of mountains in the Andes

La Concha
Sierra Nevada National Park (Venezuela)